Italian straw hat may refer to:
Un Chapeau de Paille d'Italie, an Italian play adapted into two films
Buntal hat, a straw hat from the Philippines also known as the "Italian straw hat"